is a former Japanese football player.

Club statistics

References

External links

1983 births
Living people
Hosei University alumni
Association football people from Saitama Prefecture
Japanese footballers
J2 League players
Japan Football League players
Kataller Toyama players
Sagan Tosu players
Association football defenders